The 2019 Bass Pro Shops NRA Night Race presented by Wendy's was a Monster Energy NASCAR Cup Series race held on August 17, 2019 at Bristol Motor Speedway in Bristol, Tennessee. Contested over 500 laps on the  short track, it was the 24th race of the 2019 Monster Energy NASCAR Cup Series season.

Report

Background

The Bristol Motor Speedway, formerly known as Bristol International Raceway and Bristol Raceway, is a NASCAR short track venue located in Bristol, Tennessee. Constructed in 1960, it held its first NASCAR race on July 30, 1961. Despite its short length, Bristol is among the most popular tracks on the NASCAR schedule because of its distinct features, which include extraordinarily steep banking, an all concrete surface, two pit roads, and stadium-like seating. It has also been named one of the loudest NASCAR tracks.

During driver introductions, a unique tradition is held where drivers are allowed to introduce themselves with a song of their choosing.

Entry list
 (i) denotes driver who are ineligible for series driver points.
 (R) denotes rookie driver.

† - Bayley Currey was entered for the No. 52 but was suspended by NASCAR on Thursday before the race due to violating the substance abuse policy. Kyle Weatherman will replace Currey in the No. 52 as a result.

Practice

First practice

Final practice

Qualifying
It was the first pole for Toyota in the Cup Series in 2019.

Qualifying results

Race

Stage results

Stage One
Laps: 125

Stage Two
Laps: 125

Final stage results

Stage Three
Laps: 250

Race statistics
 Lead changes: 23 among 10 different drivers
 Cautions/Laps: 8 for 61
 Red flags: 0
 Time of race: 2 hours, 49 minutes and 9 seconds
 Average speed:

Media

Television
NBC Sports covered the race on the television side. Rick Allen, 2008 Food City 500 winner Jeff Burton, and Steve Letarte called the race in the booth for the race. Dave Burns, Parker Kligerman, Marty Snider and Kelli Stavast reported from pit lane during the race.

NBC Sports relieved Dale Earnhardt Jr. of duties for this race after an incident at Elizabethton Municipal Airport where a bounced landing led to the Earnhardts' private plane crashing.  He, his wife Amy, daughter Isla, and dog Gus were not severely injured, but he was kept out as a precaution.

Radio
The Performance Racing Network had the radio call for the race, which was simulcast on Sirius XM NASCAR Radio. Doug Rice and Mark Garrow called the race from the broadcast booth when the field raced down the front straightaway. Rob Albright called the race when the field raced down the backstretch. Brad Gillie, Brett McMillan, Jim Noble and Wendy Venturini handled the action on pit road for PRN.

Standings after the race

Drivers' Championship standings

Manufacturers' Championship standings

Note: Only the first 16 positions are included for the driver standings.
. – Driver has clinched a position in the Monster Energy NASCAR Cup Series playoffs.

References

Bass Pro Shops NRA Night Race
Bass Pro Shops NRA Night Race
Bass Pro Shops NRA Night Race
NASCAR races at Bristol Motor Speedway